Catherine Walker (27 June 1945 – 23 September 2010) was a French-born fashion designer based in London. Born Catherine Marguerite Marie-Therese Baheux in Calais, Departement du Pas-de-Calais, Nord-Pas-de-Calais, France.

Walker is known for having supplied over a thousand garments for Diana, Princess of Wales.

Life and career
Walker studied Aesthetics and Philosophy at the universities of Lille and Aix-en-Provence and achieved a master's degree. While studying for a PhD she moved to London and lived in Earl's Court. She became a permanent resident after marrying solicitor John Walker in 1970. The couple had two daughters. In 1975 John Walker died while on holiday in France. Her second husband was Said Cyrus from Iran, a lecturer at the Chelsea School of Art who also became her business partner.

She began her life in fashion selling children’s clothes. She later moved into designing for women, specialising in high-end evening dresses, occasionwear and wedding gowns. In 1976 she set up her own company The Chelsea Design Company in Sydney Street, Chelsea. In 1991, Walker was awarded Designer of the Year for Glamour and in 1990 Designer of the Year for Couture at the British Fashion Awards. Walker was diagnosed with breast cancer in 1995. She became a founding sponsor of Breast Cancer Haven.

Company
Catherine Walker opened her business in 1977 in Sydney Street, London. She was a successful couturiere for over 30 years. Walker designed two seasonal collections per year, as well as wedding gowns and created a range of skincare products. Following her death, her husband Said Cyrus took over the business as head designer. He continues to run it with the same philosophy, focusing on bespoke garments for clients and eschewing runway shows, large marketing campaigns, and the wholesale trade.

Notable clients

Diana, Princess of Wales
Catherine Walker became one of the Princess of Wales' favourite designers. Her professional relationship with Diana began three months after Diana's marriage to Prince Charles in 1981, and lasted until Diana's death sixteen years later, during which time Walker provided the Princess with many of her most iconic garments.

Prince William 
Prince William had a few coats made by Catherine Walker as a child.

Lady Helen Taylor
The Duke of Kent's daughter, Lady Helen Taylor (née Windsor), wore a Catherine Walker design for her 1992 wedding to Tim Taylor.

Duchess of Kent 
Katharine, Duchess of Kent has worn a Catherine Walker dress to William, Prince of Wales wedding in 2011

Middleton family
Walker's designs are also chosen by Diana's daughter-in-law, Catherine, Princess of Wales. Catherine Walker has become one of the Princess of Wales's favourite designers and she chooses to wear the designer’s creations for important events including royal tours abroad.

Carole Middleton also has worn Catherine Walker for numerous public occasions.

Mette-Marit, Crown Princess of Norway 
Mette-Marit, Crown Princess of Norway has been seen wearing a classic Catherine Walker coatdress in red during a Nobel Peace price ceremony

Lady Gabriella Kingston 
Lady Gabriella Kingston is often seen wearing Catherine Walker to most of the official Royal events.

Lady Frederick Windsor 
Also knows as Sophie Winkleman, she has worn Catherine Walker to Princess Eugenie's wedding in 2018.  Wimbledon is one of the occasions where Sophie turns to Catherine Walker for her outfits also.

Sophie, Countess of Wessex 
Sophie has been wearing Catherine Walker garments to some official Royal events.

Marie Chevallier 
Marie Chevallier - wife of Louis Robert Paul Ducruet (son of Princess Stéphanie of Monaco and Daniel Ducruet), has chosen a Catherine Walker coatdress to attend a mass at Monaco Cathedral during the celebrations marking Monaco's National Day in Monaco, on November 19, 2019.

Dame Judith Olivia Dench 
Judi Dench has worn a bespoke Catherine Walker piece for British Vogue -Ask a legend interview 2020.

J.K. Rowling 
J.K. Rowling has worn Paddington coatdress to receive Companion of Honour in 2017.

Countess De La Warr 
Anne, Countess De La Warr attended Royal Ascot, 14 June 2011wearing a classic Catherine Walker coatdress

Death
Walker died on September 23, 2010 in a hospital after being found unconscious by a neighbour at her home  Sussex, England. She had suffered breast cancer and was a founding Sponsor of the charity called "Breast Cancer Haven". Catherine Walker is survived by her second husband Said Ismael Cyrus and her two daughters, Naomi and Marianne, from her first marriage.

References

External links
Catherine Walker Homepage

British fashion designers
1945 births
2010 deaths
Deaths from cancer in England
Deaths from breast cancer
French expatriates in the United Kingdom
University of Provence alumni